EDP Renewables North America (former names: Zilkha Renewable Energy and Horizon Wind Energy) and its subsidiaries develop, construct, own, and operate wind farms and solar parks throughout North America.

Headquartered in Houston, Texas, with 58 wind farms and 9 solar parks, EDP Renewables North America (EDPR NA) operates more than 8,200 megawatts (MW) of renewable energy projects in 14 U.S. states (Arizona, California, Illinois, Indiana, Iowa, Kansas, Minnesota, Nevada, New York, Ohio, Oklahoma, Oregon, Texas, South Carolina, Washington, and Wisconsin) as well as in Canada and Mexico.

EDPR NA is owned by EDP Renewables (EDPR), a company that develops, constructs, owns, and operates renewable electricity generation facilities. EDPR has grown significantly in recent years and is currently present in 14 countries (Belgium, Brazil, Canada, Colombia, France, Greece, Italy, Mexico, Poland, Portugal, Romania, Spain, the United Kingdom, and the United States). EDPR is the world’s fourth-largest wind energy producer, and EDPR NA represents EDPR’s largest market in terms of installed capacity and production.

History
In 2005, the company (then called Zilkha Renewable Energy, and owned by Selim Zilkha and Michael Zilkha) was purchased by investment bank Goldman Sachs for an undisclosed sum and renamed Horizon Wind Energy. In 2007, the company was acquired by Energias de Portugal for $2.15 billion and later renamed EDP Renewables North America.

References 

Wind power companies of the United States